Sir David Callender Campbell,  (29 January 1891 – 12 June 1963) was an Ulster Unionist politician in Northern Ireland.

Campbell was born in Cudappah, India where his father William Howard Campbell was a missionary working with the London Missionary Society. The third of four sons of whom the youngest, William, died of malaria on the way to England in 1894, David studied at Foyle College before going to Edinburgh University. David joined the colonial services in 1919 and served in Tanganyika and then served as deputy chief secretary in Uganda. He then became a secretary in Gibraltar and acting Lieutenant Governor of Malta. He returned and stood as the Member of Parliament (MP) for Belfast South in a 1952 by-election, and after election, served until his death in 1963. In 1959 while leader of the UUP Westminster MP's, he became involved in the row over Catholic membership of the UUP when he supported the idea in a letter to the party leader.

He served as Lieutenant-Governor of Malta, 1943–1952 and as a member of the Privy Council from 1962.

References

External links 
 

1891 births
1963 deaths
Members of the Parliament of the United Kingdom for Belfast constituencies (since 1922)
UK MPs 1951–1955
UK MPs 1955–1959
UK MPs 1959–1964
Ulster Unionist Party members of the House of Commons of the United Kingdom
Members of the Privy Council of the United Kingdom